Naama Bay is a natural bay in Sharm El Sheikh resort and is considered the main hub for tourists in the city, as it is famous for its cafes, restaurants, hotels, and bazaars.

References

External links
 http://www.eg-naama-bay.com/

Sharm El Sheikh